Abel Aferalign (born 24 August 1983) is an Ethiopian bantamweight boxer. Competing at the 2004 Summer Olympics in Athens, Greece, Aferalign lost to Bulgarian Detelin Dalakliev in the round of 32.

Aferalign qualified for the 2004 Athens Games by ending up in second place at the 2nd AIBA African 2004 Olympic Qualifying Tournament in Gaborone, Botswana. In the final, he was defeated by Morocco's Hamid Ait Bighrade.

References
 Profile Yahoo! Sports
Sports Reference

1983 births
Living people
Ethiopian male boxers
Boxers at the 2004 Summer Olympics
Bantamweight boxers
Olympic boxers of Ethiopia